Laurel Valley Sugar Plantation is located in Thibodaux, Louisiana.  It is listed on the National Register of Historic Places.

History
The plantation was originally owned by a French Acadian named Etienne Boudreaux. He was one of thousands of petit habitants who made their way to southern Louisiana after being expelled from Nova Scotia. Boudreaux bought a Spanish land grant about two miles south of Thibodaux along Bayou Lafourche in 1785. 

Not much is known about the Boudreaux family, but the 1810 census lists 13 people living at the residence, nine males and four females. The Boudreaux family home, built in 1816, is the oldest surviving structure on property. 

When Etienne died, the plantation was sold to Joseph Tucker for $35. The reason for the price is unknown. Tucker was a Virginian, who bought more than 50,000 acres of land along Bayou Lafourche. It was at one time the largest producer of sugar in Lafourche Parish, and a mill was built on the property for this purpose.

As many as 135 slaves lived and worked on the property prior to the Civil War. While the main house built by Tucker was destroyed during the Civil War, shotgun houses (slave quarters) and Creole cabins remain on the property. The mill stopped production in the 1930s, and sustained significant damage during Hurricane Betsy in 1965. In 2021, the plantation sustained damage during Hurricane Ida and lost some of the original buildings. However, Laurel Valley was able to reopen again 1 month later and currently offers guided tours of the property.
It is named after where it is located.

Laurel Valley today
With over fifty original structures remaining it is the largest surviving 19th- and 20th-century sugar plantation complex left in the United States and is still a working sugarcane farm. The general store on the property is open to the public, displaying tools and farm implements used in the cultivation of sugar cane as well as locally made arts and crafts.  The store wasn't originally at the plantation, it had to be moved there.  Its proprietor was Leon Z. Boudreaux.

Laurel Valley Plantation was added as a historic district to the National Register of Historic Places on March 24, 1978.

Contributing properties

The historic  district comprises about 80 buildings and structures dating from c.1850 to c.1910:

Along LA 308

Plantation Church, also known as Old Fountain Missionary Baptist Church, comprises the adjacent cemetery.
Double Creole House #1, built c.1890.
Double Creole House #2, built c.1890.

Plantation Store, built c.1890.
Double Creole House #3, built c.1890.
Creole House #1, built c.1900.
Creole House #2, built c.1910.
Shotgun House #1, built c.1890.

Main House Complex
Plantation House, built c.1880.
Servants' Quarters, built c.1880.

Single family Creole houses area

Double Creole House #4, . No more standing.
School House, . No more standing.
Shotgun House #2, built c.1910.
Creole House #3, built c.1880.
Creole House #4, built c.1880.

Creole House #5, built c.1880.
Creole House #6, built c.1880.
Creole House #7, built c.1880.
Telephone Booth, . No more standing.
Weighing Station, built c.1910.
Plantation Foreman House, built c.1900.

Creole double houses area

Watchman/Overseer's House, built c.1900.
Double Creole Tenant House #1, built c.1880.
Double Creole Tenant House #2, built c.1880.
Double Creole Tenant House #3, built c.1880.
Double Creole Tenant House #4, built c.1880.

Double Creole Tenant House #5, built c.1880.
Double Creole Tenant House #6, built c.1880.
Double Creole Tenant House #7, built c.1880.
Double Creole Tenant House #8, built c.1880.
Double Creole Tenant House #9, built c.1880.
Double Creole Tenant House #10, built c.1880.
Creole Tenant House #1, built c.1880.
Office/Carriage House, built c.1880.
Shop, built c.1880.

Production Complex and Shotgun houses

Single Tenant House #1, built c.1884.
Single Tenant House #2, built c.1884.
Single Tenant House #3, built c.1884.
Single Tenant House #4, built c.1884.
Single Tenant House #5, built c.1884.
Single Tenant House #6, built c.1884.
Multiple Tenant House/Storage Shed, built c.1900. No more standing.
Single Tenant Shotgun House #1, built c.1900.
Single Tenant Shotgun House #2, built c.1900.
Single Tenant Shotgun House #3, built c.1900.
Single Tenant Shotgun House #4, built c.1900.
Single Tenant Shotgun House #5, built c.1900.
Single Tenant Shotgun House #6, built c.1900.
Single Tenant Shotgun House #7, built c.1900.
Single Tenant Shotgun House #8, built c.1900.
Single Tenant Shotgun House #9, built c.1900.
Single Tenant Shotgun House #10, built c.1900.

Single Tenant Shotgun House #11, built c.1900.
Single Tenant Shotgun House #12, built c.1900.
Single Tenant Shotgun House #13, built c.1900.
Single Tenant Shotgun House #14, built c.1900.
Single Tenant Shotgun House #15, built c.1900.
Single Tenant Shotgun House #16, built c.1900.
Single Tenant Shotgun House #17, built c.1900.
Single Tenant Shotgun House #18, built c.1900.
Single Tenant Shotgun House #19, built c.1900.
Single Tenant Shotgun House #20, built c.1900.
Single Tenant Shotgun House #21, built c.1900.
Single Tenant Shotgun House #22, built c.1900.
Single Tenant Shotgun House #23, built c.1900.
Single Tenant Shotgun House #24, built c.1900.
Single Tenant Shotgun House #25, built c.1900.
Loading Crane, .
Sugar Mill, built c.1850.
Exhaust Stack, built c.1850.
Boarding House, built c.1900.
Grinding Mill Pump Station, .
Corn Shed Barn, built c.1880.
Shed, .
Pump House, .
Creole Tenant House #2, built c.1890.
Weigh Station, built c.1890.

Popular culture
Several movies have been filmed at Laurel Valley, including Angel Heart, Crazy in Alabama, A Gathering of Old Men, Interview with the Vampire, A Lesson Before Dying, Double Exposure: The Story of Margaret Bourke-White, and Ray.The Depeche Mode Music Video "Freelove" was also filmed on the plantation.

See also
 National Register of Historic Places listings in Lafourche Parish, Louisiana

References

External links

•The Boudreaux Years
City of Thibodeaux: Areas of Interest - includes visiting information for the Laurel Valley Village/Plantation Museum and Country Store

Houses on the National Register of Historic Places in Louisiana
Queen Anne architecture in Louisiana
Renaissance Revival architecture in Louisiana
Houses completed in 1850
Houses in Lafourche Parish, Louisiana
Historic districts on the National Register of Historic Places in Louisiana
Historic American Engineering Record in Louisiana
Thibodaux, Louisiana
Sugar plantations in Louisiana
Museums in Lafourche Parish, Louisiana
Agriculture museums in the United States
National Register of Historic Places in Lafourche Parish, Louisiana
Slave cabins and quarters in the United States